German submarine U-2506 was a Type XXI U-boat (one of the "Elektroboote") of Nazi Germany's Kriegsmarine, built for service in World War II. The submarine was laid down on 29 May 1944 at the Blohm & Voss yard at Hamburg, launched on 5 August 1944, and commissioned on 31 August 1944 under the command of Kapitänleutnant Horst von Schroeter, who commanded her until 9 May 1945. U-2506 conducted no patrols, and surrendered on 9 May 1945 in Bergen, Norway. She was then transferred to Lerwick on 18 June 1945, then Lisahally on 21 June 1945.

Design
Like all Type XXI U-boats, U-2506 had a displacement of  when at the surface and  while submerged. The submarine was powered by two MAN SE supercharged six-cylinder M6V40/46KBB diesel engines each providing , two Siemens-Schuckert GU365/30 double-acting electric motors each providing , and two Siemens-Schuckert silent running GV232/28 electric motors each providing .

U-2506 was fitted with six  torpedo tubes in the bow and four  C/30 anti-aircraft guns. She could carry twenty-three torpedoes or seventeen torpedoes and twelve mines. The complement was five officers and fifty-two men.

References

Bibliography

External links
 

Type XXI submarines
U-boats commissioned in 1944
U-boats sunk in 1946
World War II submarines of Germany
World War II shipwrecks in the Atlantic Ocean
1944 ships
Ships built in Hamburg
Operation Deadlight
Maritime incidents in 1946